Annie France (1915–2012) was a French film actress active during the 1930s and 1940s.

Selected filmography
 White Cargo (1937)
 Crossroads (1938)
 Fort Dolorès (1939)
 Bécassine (1940)
 Moulin Rouge (1940)
 The Last Penny (1946)

References

Bibliography
 Goble, Alan. The Complete Index to Literary Sources in Film. Walter de Gruyter, 1999.

External links

1915 births
2012 deaths
French film actresses
Actresses from Paris